Paul Dutton Grannis (26 June 1938) is an American physicist.

Grannis received the B. Eng. Phys., with Distinction, from Cornell University in 1961 and Ph.D. from University of California, Berkeley in 1965 under the supervision of Owen Chamberlain with thesis Measurement of the Polarization Parameter in Proton-Proton Scattering from 1.7 to 6.1 BeV. Since 1966 Grannis has been at Stony Brook University (SUNY at Stony Brook). He has been a visiting scientist at CERN (ISR, LEP Collider), Brookhaven National Laboratory, Fermilab, Rutherford Appleton Laboratory, University College London and Imperial College London.

From 2001 to 2005, Grannis was the chair of the Department of Physics and Astronony at Stony Brook University.

Grannis has worked to bring an electron positron collider capable of studying the Higgs boson and related questions regarding electroweak symmetry breaking since 1998.   He has served as leader or member of the US group advocating for the linear collider (1999-2002); the International Linear Collider Steering Committee (2002-2005; 2011-2013); the panel that established the parameters and scope of the International Linear Collider (2003 and 2006); the  panel that recommended the technology choice for the ILC (2003-2004); the search for the director of the Global Design Effort (2004-2005), the Linear Collider Steering Group of the Americas (2010 - 2013), and the panel  to select the experimental detectors for the ILC (2008 - 2013).  From 2005 to 2007 he served as Program Manager and Scientific Advisor for the Office of High Energy Physics of the US Department of Energy.  Since 2013 he has served on the Americas Linear Collider Committee.

Awards 
 1961-1965 Danforth Foundation Fellow
 1969-1971 Alfred P. Sloan Foundation Fellow
 1987 Fellow of the American Physical Society
 1992 Exceptional Teaching Award, Stony Brook
 1997 Exceptional Service Award, US Department of Energy
 2000–2001 John S. Guggenheim Fellowship
2001 PPARC Fellow
 2001 Panofsky Prize for the D0 experiment on Tevatron of Fermilab 
 2009 Honorary Doctorate from Ohio University
2016 Foreign member Russian Academy of Sciences
2019 European Physical Society High Energy Physics prize, shared with D0 collaboration for discovery of the top quark

References

External links

1938 births
Living people
20th-century American physicists
21st-century American physicists
Cornell University alumni
University of California, Berkeley
Stony Brook University faculty
Fellows of the American Physical Society
Sloan Research Fellows
Winners of the Panofsky Prize
Foreign Members of the Russian Academy of Sciences
People associated with CERN